Lal R. Jayawardena (Sinhala:ලාල් ජයවර්ධන) (1935–2004) was a noted Sri Lankan economist and diplomat. He was the first director of the World Institute for Development Economics Research (WIDER) (1985–1993) and Sri Lankan Treasury Secretary in the 1970s. Jayawardena had served as Sri Lankan Ambassador to the EEC, Belgium, Luxembourg and the Netherlands (1978–82) and Sri Lanka's High Commissioner to the UK and Ireland (1999–2000). He was an Economic Adviser to the Sri Lankan President and Deputy Chairman of the Sri Lankan National Development Council.

As the Treasury Secretary, he was also instrumental in the reform package that opened up the Sri Lanka economy in the mid-1970s and he chaired a study group on Indo-Sri Lanka Economic Cooperation, whose final report of formed the basis of the Indo-Sri Lanka Bilateral Free Trade Agreement (1998). He was also the Second Vice-Chairman of the Group of 24.

Born to N. U. Jayawardena the former Governor of the Central Bank of Ceylon and Amybelle Millicent Jayawardena; he was educated at the Royal College, Colombo, where he was a contemporary of Gamini Seneviratne and Chris Pinto. Jayawardena graduated from King's College, Cambridge in Economic Tripos and went on to gain his PhD from the University of Cambridge. During his time at Cambridge, his contemporaries were Amartya Sen, Richard Layard, Tam Dalyell, Mahbub ul Haque, Jagdish Bhagwati, Manmohan Singh and Geoff Harcourt; he was also a member of the Cambridge Apostles He was married to Dr. Kumari Jayawardene.

See also
 Sri Lankan Non Career Diplomats
 List of Sri Lankan non-career Permanent Secretaries

References 

Development economists
Sinhalese civil servants
Sri Lankan diplomats
Sri Lankan economists
High Commissioners of Sri Lanka to the United Kingdom
Ambassadors of Sri Lanka to the European Economic Community
Ambassadors of Sri Lanka to Belgium
Ambassadors of Sri Lanka to Luxembourg
Ambassadors of Sri Lanka to the Netherlands
Ambassadors of Sri Lanka to Ireland
Alumni of Royal College, Colombo
Alumni of King's College, Cambridge
1935 births
2004 deaths
Permanent secretaries of Sri Lanka